Mississauga Cogeneration Plant was a natural gas power station partially owned by TransAlta and located adjacent to Toronto Pearson International Airport. The plant was primarily used to supply steam and power to nearby industrial clients with surplus power sold onto the Ontario grid. From 1992 to 2007, it supplied thermal energy to the McDonnell Douglas and later Boeing aircraft parts plant. As of 2018 the plant is no longer actively generating electricity. The plant started demolition in April 2020 and space will be used for the new Bombardier plant to be built in this location.

The plant was located across near Airport Road and Derry Road next to the former Boeing aircraft plant (now demolished).

See also

 GTAA Cogeneration Plant

References

Buildings and structures in Mississauga
Natural gas-fired power stations in Ontario
Toronto Pearson International Airport
1992 establishments in Ontario